Northwest Arena is a multi-purpose arena in Jamestown, New York, USA. It hosts local sporting events and concerts. It is the home of the Jamestown Rebels junior hockey team in the North American Hockey League.

It has been the home of two short-lived minor league hockey teams: the Jamestown Titans of the North Eastern Hockey League in 2003-04 and the Jamestown Vikings of the Mid-Atlantic Hockey League in 2007–08. It served as the home of the junior hockey Jamestown Jets from 2008 to 2011, also hosting the 2009 UJHL All Star Game, and occasionally hosts training camp for the Erie Otters. From 2011 to 2013, the arena was the home of the Jamestown Ironmen, a North American Hockey League organization; from 2014 to 2018, the Southern Tier Xpress of the NA3HL resided in the arena. Today, it is home to the Jamestown Rebels, another NAHL team. The capacity of the "Arena A" for hockey is 1,900 people; arena management explored expanding that capacity to 3,000 seats to lure a professional franchise, but this proposal was never accepted. An expansion of the facility that took place between 2018 and 2021 did not add any additional seating capacity.

The Arena has recently played host to a number of major concerts including: Kenny Rogers Christmas & Hits Tour, Clint Black, Michael W. Smith, YES & ASIA, Aaron Tippin, Aids in Africa World Village Tour, World Famous Lipizanner Stallions 40th Anniversary, Golden Gloves Boxing, Buffalo Sabres Alumni.

The arena is one of several venues that was utilized for Western New York's hosting of the 2011 World Junior Ice Hockey Championships. The arena hosted exhibition games before the tournament proper began.

Naming rights to the arena have been held by Northwest Bank since the arena's inception. Until 2016, the arena was known as Jamestown Savings Bank Arena, as the five Jamestown branches of the bank had operated as "Jamestown Savings Bank" since 1998.

References

External links
Arena homepage

Indoor arenas in New York (state)
Indoor ice hockey venues in the United States
Sports in Jamestown, New York
Sports venues in New York (state)
Sports venues in Chautauqua County, New York
2002 establishments in New York (state)
Sports venues completed in 2002
Buildings and structures in Chautauqua County, New York